Luis Flores (born 5 November 1978) is a Spanish sprinter. He competed in the men's 4 × 400 metres relay at the 2004 Summer Olympics.

References

1978 births
Living people
Athletes (track and field) at the 2004 Summer Olympics
Spanish male sprinters
Olympic athletes of Spain
Place of birth missing (living people)